Eucocconeis is a genus of diatoms belonging to the family Achnanthidiaceae.

The genus was first described by Cleve ex F. Meister in 1912.

Species:
 Eucocconeis alpestris (Brun) H. Lange-Bertalot
 Eucocconeis aretasii (E. Manguin) H. Lange-Bertalot
 Eucocconeis austriaca (Hustedt) H. Lange-Bertalot
 Eucocconeis depressa (Cleve) H. Lange-Bertalot
 Eucocconeis diluviana (Hustedt) H. Lange-Bertalot
 Eucocconeis dorogostaisky (Jasnitsky) Sheshukova-Poretzkaya
 Eucocconeis flexella (Kützing) Meister, 1912
 Eucocconeis laevis (Østrup) H. Lange-Bertalot
 Eucocconeis lapponica Hustedt, 1924
 Eucocconeis leptostriata H. Lange-Bertalot
 Eucocconeis ninckei (P. Guermeur & E. Manguin) H. Lange-Bertalot
 Eucocconeis onegensis Wislouch & Kolbe, 1916
 Eucocconeis poretzkyi (Jasnitsky) Sheshukova-Poretzkaya
 Eucocconeis quadratarea (Østrup) H. Lange-Bertalot, 1999

References

Achnanthales
Diatom genera